Proctor's Theatre (officially stylized as Proctors since 2007; however, the marquee retains the apostrophe) is a theatre and former vaudeville house located in Schenectady, New York, United States. Many famous artists have performed there, notably Mariah Carey (whose 1993 top-rated Thanksgiving special was taped there), Britney Spears, Hal Holbrook, Ted Wiles, and George Burns, as well as many others. It has one of the largest movie screens in the Northeast.

The theatre was opened on December 27, 1926. It was designed by architect Thomas Lamb. Four years later it hosted the first public demonstration of television. In 1979 the building was added to the National Register of Historic Places, shortly before being renovated after a long period of decline and neglect. A renovation completed in 2007 added two theatres to the complex, providing a variety of performance spaces.

Building
The theater building is located on the south side of State Street (NY 5), in a densely developed commercial area. The exterior of the building and its interior arcade are included in the Register listing.

It is a three-story building with attic. The North (front) facade is faced in stucco, with engaged Doric pilasters. Ornamentation includes garlands and paterae on the friezes. A large marquee covers the sidewalk in front.

Inside, the arcade that connects the entrance to the theatre features space for (originally) 14 boutiques, with five copper-framed glass windows. A marble staircase leads to the upstairs offices, and the box office and showcase are paneled in Walnut.

The foyer is carpeted in red, with men's and women's smoking rooms on either side. Two more marble staircases lead to the balcony level. A pastoral mural in sepia decorates the wall. The staircases lead to a balcony promenade with an authentic Louis XV style sofa. Decoration includes Corinthian columns, iron railings and extensive gold leaf detailing.

Corinthian columns also flank the proscenium arch over the stage. Gold leaf detail is all over the domed ceiling and entrance arches, in contrast to the black and silver damask wall coverings. The side loges are trimmed with iron grilles in the arches and heavy velvet drapes. Light is provided by a central black and gold chandelier with 192 lamps, flanked by six smaller fixtures.

History
The arrival of General Electric led to rapid growth in Schenectady through the late 19th and early 20th century. The city's streetcar network made its downtown more accessible to the city. The vaudeville impresario Frederick Freeman Proctor chose to build his first theater in 1912. In the last years of his life, he decided to replace it. It cost $1.5 million ($ in contemporary dollars) to build and opened on December 27, 1926, with a showing of the silent film Stranded in Paris. The audience was so impressed by the lavish facilities that no one complained about the malfunctioning Wurlitzer organ.

Proctor had sound equipment installed two years later for the new sound films. Shortly before his death in 1929, Proctor sold his theater chain to RKO Pictures. The next year it was the site of the first public demonstration of television, when an orchestra performed under the direction of the image of a conductor in General Electric Research Laboratory approximately 3 miles away.

The theatre had fallen into disrepair throughout the 1960s and '70s while population shifted and moved out of Schenectady. The theatre was going to be torn down for use of the plot as a parking lot until a group of activists joined together and created the Arts Districts of Schenectady.

In the fall of 2007, Proctors finished a $24.5 million expansion. Several local firms were involved, including Stracher Roth Gilmore (architectural), Ryan-Biggs Associates (structural), M/E Engineering (mechanical, electrical, plumbing) and Adirondack Scenic (theatrical & rigging designers). The renovation added two theatres, making three separate theatre venues available for the public:
 Main Theatre, with a historic proscenium stage, seats about 2700
 GE Black Box Theatre, which will seat 450. This multifunctional theatre has retractable seating. This will allow the space to be reconfigured in unusual ways for experimental performances. 
 440 Upstairs, this 100-seat theatre located in the Wright Family Building at 440 State Street will support smaller performances, such as one man/woman shows, jazz performances, or a place for playwrights to showcase new material with staged readings. {This venue was sold off and the building was demolished in 2011  to make room for construction of the headquarters building of Transfinder.}

In September 2007, upon completion of the expansion project, Proctor's Theatre changed its name to "Proctors" to reflect its three theatres.

On July 18, 2009, the theatre won the Outstanding Historic Theatre Award, presented by the League of Historic American Theatres at their annual meeting in Cleveland. Proctors hosted the group's convention in 2011.

Timeline of the expansion
2004:
Replacement of the 25+ year-old roof
Acoustic wall built in main theatre to improve sound quality
Foundation work for new stagehouse begins

2005:
$1 million sound system installed
Revamped candy counter 
Tripling the size of the former stagehouse, including a three-bay enclosed loading dock, crossover, and new dressing & multi purpose rooms backstage

2006:
Construction started for the GE Theatre, which includes 4,000 sq-flat floor theatre, 450 seats that are retractable, and a 60' x 60' wide-format screen and equipment known as iWERKS-ExtremeScreen.
New carpet in the main theatre
New furniture in the men's’ lounge of the main theatre
Restoration of the Golub Arcade
Creation of the Ed Sells & Eveline Ward-Sells Green Room
Larger and improved gift shops
Restoration on decorative plaster work and plaster
Removal of paint from frosted glass panels and copper edging

2007:
Additional construction of the former Carl company

2018:
In 2018, Proctors Theater took seven weeks and replaced all their main stage seating to bigger and comfier seats, while also fitting in more than originally installed. They now can seat 2,594 patrons in the theaters fixed seating. After adding the total of pit orchestra seats and handicapped seating they can fit 2,700 patrons in the theater.

1st Floor:
Completion of the GE Theatre
New box office
Expanded lobby space for easier patron traffic flow
More restroom facilities for patrons
3-story atrium outside of GE Theatre
Various retail outlets: Northeastern Fine Jewelry and The Muddy Cup Coffee House & Cafe

2nd Floor:
Gallery & various conference spaces
New administrative offices & board room

3rd Floor:
TBD

See also
Proctor's Theater (Troy, New York)
National Register of Historic Places listings in Schenectady County, New York

References

External links
Proctors official website

Cinemas and movie theaters in New York (state)
Buildings and structures in Schenectady, New York
Theatres on the National Register of Historic Places in New York (state)
Movie palaces
Theatres completed in 1926
Tourist attractions in Schenectady County, New York
1926 establishments in New York (state)
National Register of Historic Places in Schenectady County, New York
Thomas W. Lamb buildings
Public venues with a theatre organ